Gloria Ferrandiz (1893 in Uruguay – 1970) was an Argentine actress of the classic Argentine cinema era. She starred in over 40 films, including the 1962 film Una Jaula no tiene secretos.

Selected filmography
Las seis suegras de Barba Azul (1945)
 The Trap (1949)
This Is My Life (1952)
 Black Ermine (1953)
 Beyond Oblivion (1956)
 Behind a Long Wall (1958)
 This Earth Is Mine (1961)
 Una Jaula no tiene secretos (1962)

References

External links
 
 

1893 births
1970 deaths
Argentine film actresses